Sampaio Corrêa Futebol e Esporte, commonly known as Sampaio Corrêa, is a Brazilian football club based in Saquarema, Rio de Janeiro state.

History
The club was founded on February 20, 2006. Sampaio Corrêa won the Campeonato Carioca Third Level in 2009.

Achievements

 Campeonato Carioca Third Level:
 Winners (1): 2009

Stadium
Sampaio Corrêa Futebol e Esporte play their home games at Estádio Elcyr Resende de Mendonça. The stadium has a maximum capacity of 10,000 people.

References

 
Association football clubs established in 2006
Football clubs in Rio de Janeiro (state)
2006 establishments in Brazil